Luca Grimaldi De Castro (Genoa, 1530 - Genoa, 1611) was the 85th Doge of the Republic of Genoa.

Biography 
Grimaldi De Castro rose to the dogato with the elections of 1 March 1605, the fortieth in biennial succession and the eighty-fifth in republican history. During his regency he tried to find a solution to the conflicts that had directly with the Holy See for the planned demolition of a monastery, a necessary work for the creation of the new road axis between the Basilica della Santissima Annunziata del Vastato and the door of San Tomaso. The annals also mention subsequent disagreements between the doge and the Governor of Milan Pedro Enríquez de Acevedo for the territories of Sarzana and Lunigiana. After his mandate ended, on March 2, 1607, he was appointed perpetual prosecutor and continued to serve the republic in various positions until the age of 81. Grimaldi died in Genoa during 1611.

See also 

 Republic of Genoa
 Doge of Genoa
 House of Grimaldi

References 

17th-century Doges of Genoa
1530 births
1611 deaths

People from Genoa